"Little Things" is a song written and sung by Bobby Goldsboro, which he recorded on November 19, 1964, and released on November 24, 1964. The song reached No. 13 Billboard Hot 100.

Background
Goldsboro wrote the up-tempo "Little Things" after a series of ballads that he had written and recorded, and his producer Jack Gold wanted him to continue writing ballads. Goldsboro recorded the song in Nashville, as were the other tracks in the album. Goldsboro had originally intended the song to be recorded in 2/4 time, but after hearing a copy of "Oh, Pretty Woman" that his friend Roy Orbison had sent him, he changed the beat of "Little Things" to 4/4. The arrangement of the song was done by Goldsboro and Bill Justis. In the song, Ray Stevens sang the back-up vocals. The song was recorded on November 19, 1964 and released five days later.

In 1965, the song spent 12 weeks on the Billboard Hot 100 chart, peaking at No. 13. In Canada, the song reached No. 4 on Canada's RPM Top 40 & 5, and No. 4 on RPM's Adult Contemporary chart. The song was ranked No. 81 on Billboards year-end chart of "Top Singles of 1965".

Covers
Dave Berry released a cover of "Little Things" in 1965, which reached No. 5 on the UK Singles Chart, and No. 9 on the Irish chart.

Chart performance

References 

1964 songs
1964 singles
Bobby Goldsboro songs
United Artists Records singles
Songs written by Bobby Goldsboro